Phanis is a genus of longhorn beetles of the subfamily Lamiinae, containing the following species:

 Phanis armicollis Fairmaire, 1893
 Phanis tanganjicae Breuning, 1978

References

Crossotini